The Michigan Wolverines women's gymnastics team represents the University of Michigan and competes in the Big Ten Conference. Under head coach Bev Plocki, the team has won 27 Big Ten championships and advanced to 31 NCAA Women's Gymnastics Championships, including sixteen consecutive appearances from 1993 to 2008. In 2021, the Wolverines won the program's first-ever team national title.

History
The Michigan Wolverines women's gymnastics team was formed in 1976. In its 42-year history, the team has had six coaches.

Newt Loken, head of the men's gymnastics team from 1948 to 1983, was hired to be the first women's coach and served one season. Anne Cornell and Scott Ponto both served short tenures before Sheri Hyatt for five seasons starting in 1980. Under Hyatt, the program won its first Big Ten conference championship and qualified to its first NCAA tournament, both in 1982.

Hyatt was followed in 1985 by Dana Kempthorn, and then in 1990 by current head coach Bev Plocki. Plocki has led the Wolverines to twenty-six Big Ten titles, 30 NCAA tournament appearances, 26 NCAA Women's Gymnastics Championships, including sixteen consecutive championship berths from 1993 to 2008.

The Wolverines have had five gymnasts who have won NCAA individual championships.  Beth Wymer won the NCAA championship in the uneven bars three consecutive years from 1993 to 1995.  Elise Ray won the NCAA all-around championship in 2001 (tied with UCLA's Onnie Willis), the balance beam championship in 2002 and the uneven bars in 2004. In 2011, Kylee Botterman won the NCAA all-around championship. In 2013, Joanna Sampson won the NCAA championship on floor exercise. In 2019, Natalie Wojcik won the NCAA championship on balance beam.

The Wolverines have qualified for the NCAA Championships 29 times. They have qualified to the Super Six team finals ten times: Since the format of the NCAA Championships changed starting in 2019, the Wolverines have qualified to the Four on the Floor team finals one time. In 2021 the team won their first NCAA Championship with a program-best score of 198.2500.

Coaches

Head coaches

Coaches for the 2022–23 season

Championships

Super Six Appearances

Four on the Floor appearances

Individual champions

Facilities

Michigan's home competitions are held at the 12,693-seat Crisler Center. In 2002, the  Donald R. Shepherd Women's Gymnastics Training Center was dedicated.  The Shepherd Center is the practice and training home of the women's gymnastics team.  The facility has  of training space; the remaining  contains a training room, coaches offices, a locker room, a team lounge, and a study area.

Roster

2022–2023 Roster

Past Olympians 
 Elise Ray (2000)

References

External links